was a town located in Shimotsuga District, Tochigi Prefecture, Japan.

As of 2003, the town had an estimated population of 28,368 and a density of 712.76 persons per km². The total area was 39.80 km².

On March 29, 2010, Ōhira, along with the towns of Fujioka and Tsuga (all from Shimotsuga District), was merged into the expanded city of Tochigi.

External links
 Tochigi official website 

Dissolved municipalities of Tochigi Prefecture